Inka Wasi (Quechua inka Inca, wasi house, "Inca house", hispanicized spelling Incahuasi) is a mountain in the Andes of Peru, about  high. It is situated in the Ayacucho Region, Lucanas Province, Cabana District. It lies south of Anqasi and northeast of Misapata.

References 

Mountains of Peru
Mountains of Ayacucho Region